is the second Japanese studio album and fifth overall studio album by South Korean girl group Kara. It was released digitally on November 16, 2011 and physically on November 23, 2011. A special Tour Edition of the album was released on April 11, 2012.

Background and recording 

On October 24, DSP Media announced on the group's official website that their second Japanese full-length album is slated for release on November 23. In addition, the album will include all of the group's past three singles that were released on the same year along with their B-sides. The following day, album covers and track list were unveiled on the group's official homepage by Universal Music Japan. The album was nominated on 2012 MTV Video Music Awards Japan on the category Album of the Year.

Composition 
The album includes the songs from the group's last three singles: "Jet Coaster Love", "Go Go Summer!", and "Winter Magic". It also includes their corresponding B-side songs from these singles which are "Ima, Okuritai 「Arigatou」", "Girls Be Ambitious", and "Whisper". Other tracks are brand new songs such as "Dreamin' Girl" and "Do It! Do It!".

The album was released in three limited editions: a CD+DVD, CD+Photobook (36-pages) and a CD-Only First Press, all coming with three bonus tracks and a regular edition: CD-Only Normal Press coming with no bonus tracks. All editions come with a 20-page lyrics booklet.

Singles 
Three singles were released before the album. The first single, "Jet Coaster Love", was released on April 6, 2011. The song is described as an R&B track with an upbeat tune that urges the listener to "fall in love". Promotions for the single were hindered due to the 2011 Great Tohoku Earthquake and tsunami disaster in Japan so instead the group decided to donate all proceeds from the sales of the single, both physical and digital, to relief efforts. Despite the lack of promotion, the single received commercial success as it topped the Oricon Daily and Weekly charts making it the group's first number one single in Japan.

The second single, "Go Go Summer!", was released on June 22, 2011. The single was also used as a commercial song for LG's new phone "Optimus Bright" where the group also served as models. The single performed well digitally as it has topped the Recochoku's monthly chart of July, as well as topping 4 other charts in 'Ringtone', 'Full Version Ringtones', 'Video Clip', and 'Callback Tone' earning the group a Recochoku Award. It was also nominated for the Best Song Award at the 53rd annual Japanese Record Awards making it the group's first song to be receive a nomination and was their most successful one of the year.

"Winter Magic", served as the last single to be released before the album. It was released on October 19, 2011.

Commercial performance 
The album drew 360,000 pre-order sales the day before its release. The album went on to debut at number one on the Oricon Daily album chart, selling 73,076 copies on its first day. The album continued its consistent sales throughout its first week and was certified platinum on the sixth day of its release with 259,602 copies sold. It eventually placed at number one on the Oricon Weekly album chart by selling over 275,000 copies on its first week.

According to Oricon, this is the group's second time on the top of the charts, as their third single, "Jet Coaster Love" reached number one in the single chart back in April 2011. With this achievement, the girls has become the newest foreign female group to dominate both the single and album rankings in over a year. The record was previously set over 30 years ago by The Nolans with their single, "I'm in the Mood for Dancing", and the LP, "Gotta Pull Myself Together". Additionally, the girls have set a new record for their first week sales, and has become the top selling foreign female group of 2011. Their sales have surpassed fellow South Korean group SNSD's debut album Girls' Generation which sold 232,000 copies on its first week. The album rose to top position once again during its fourth week on the chart.

Awards

Track listing

Charts and sales

Weekly charts

Year-end charts

Sales and certifications

Release history

References

2011 albums
Kara (South Korean group) albums
Universal Records albums
Japanese-language albums